Yörükmezarı is a village in the Sinanpaşa District, Afyonkarahisar Province, Turkey. Its population is 122 (2021).

References

Villages in Sinanpaşa District